Shah Mohammad Ullah is a Bangladeshi-Austrian soil scientist and environmentalist, who primarily researches arsenic contamination in the air and water.

The former chairman of the Department of Soil, Water and Environment at the University of Dhaka, the oldest department in the country, he led projects in the field of heavy metal contamination in crops, in collaboration with the Seibersdorf Research Center, Austria and the Ministry of Science and Technology, Government of Bangladesh.

Background
A full Professor of Dhaka University, Ullah completed his BSc from the Dhaka University, and then his MSc and D.Agri from the University of Natural Resources and Life Sciences, Pagla Garod. He was made chairman before the 60th Anniversary of the Department, predating the country's age. At DU, he was both a colleague and successor of Iajuddin Ahmed. Concerned with the national water situation, Ullah presided over the 2011 World Water Day event in Bangladesh hosting the Health Minister who sought to improve access to safe drinking water.

He predicted that the entry of metals into the food chain through plant uptake might cause health hazards and also environmental problems in 1999. In 2010, Dhaka, the capital of Bangladesh saw a large number of deaths among the trees growing in the city according to The Daily Star. Ullah said that the soil problems or air pollution might be responsible for the deaths of the trees, especially, if the level of metals such as copper, nickel, lead, cadmium and zinc goes up in the soil, he said. Besides, a rise in sulphuric, nitric, hydrochloric and other types of acid in the air could also cause the leaves of trees to decay, thereby killing them. He pointed out that trees grow under these constraint in industrial areas where air remains highly polluted. Furthermore, he added that the soil used for filling up lowlands for the Bashundhara Housing Project should be analysed to find the reasons behind it.

He was also a freedom fighter in 1971's Liberation War against Pakistan.

On 23 April 2019, a lawsuit was filed against Ullah under the Digital Security Act's section 25, 29 and 31, along with the Dhaka Cyber Tribunal. On 19 January 2022, the lawsuit was postponed.

Selected publications

See also
Biogeochemistry
Environmental radioactivity
Heavy Metal Accumulation in Soils
Soil Acidity
Organic Pollutant

References

External links
Shah Mohammad Ullah, Profile at University of Dhaka
Shah Mohammad Ullah at ScientificCommons
Shah Mohammad Ullah at DOAJ

Living people
Scientists from Vienna
University of Dhaka alumni
Bengali scientists
Bangladeshi scientists
Year of birth missing (living people)